ConceptDraw OFFICE is a proprietary office software suite of business productivity tools, developed by Computer Systems Odessa for use with either Microsoft Windows and macOS operating systems.
ConceptDraw OFFICE is composed of mind mapping, project management and business diagramming tools.
The three components use the cross-format exchange technology, allowing users to employ a visual approach to information management  whereby the same set of data can be shown as a mind map, Gantt chart, or business graphic design.

Components 
 ConceptDraw MINDMAP - Mind mapping and brainstorming tool. Developed for Microsoft Windows and macOS.
 ConceptDraw PROJECT  - Project management package. Developed for Microsoft Windows and macOS.
 ConceptDraw DIAGRAM (previously known as ConceptDraw PRO) - Diagramming and vector graphics software.  Developed for Microsoft Windows and macOS.
 ConceptDraw Solutions - An online collection of add-ons, samples, and templates designed to solve specific professional tasks in education,  project management, writing, business process modeling, software development, or engineering, among others. The suite uses its own proprietary set of file formats.

Versions

References

External links 

Office suites for Windows
Office suites for macOS
Office suites